The 2018 Dartmouth Big Green football team represented Dartmouth College in the 2018 NCAA Division I FCS football season as a member of the Ivy League. The Big Green were led by head coach Buddy Teevens in his 14th straight year and 19th overall. They played their home games at Memorial Field. They finished the season 9–1 overall and 6–1 in Ivy League play to place second. Dartmouth averaged 4,006 fans per game.

Previous season
The Big Green finished the 2017 season 8–2, 5–2 in Ivy League play to finish in a tie for second place.

Schedule
The 2018 schedule consisted of five home games and five away games. The Big Green hosted Ivy League foes Penn, Harvard, and Brown, and traveled to Yale, Princeton, Columbia, and Cornell.

Dartmouth's non-conference opponents were Georgetown and Holy Cross of the Patriot League, and Sacred Heart of the Northeast Conference. Homecoming coincided with the game against Harvard on October 27.

Game summaries

Georgetown

at Holy Cross

Penn

at Yale

Sacred Heart

at Columbia

Harvard

at Princeton

at Cornell

Brown

Ranking movements

References

Dartmouth
Dartmouth Big Green football seasons
Dartmouth Big Green football